Herman Kakou (born 20 August 1991) is an Ivorian professional footballer who plays as a midfielder.

References

1991 births
Living people
Ivorian footballers
Saint-Colomban Sportive Locminé players
Mesaimeer SC players
Al Ittihad Alexandria Club players
Al Masry SC players
Association football midfielders
Egyptian Premier League players
Qatari Second Division players
Qatar Stars League players
Ivorian expatriate footballers
Expatriate footballers in France
Ivorian expatriate sportspeople in France
Expatriate footballers in Qatar
Ivorian expatriate sportspeople in Qatar
Expatriate footballers in Egypt
Ivorian expatriate sportspeople in Egypt